Newtown Football Club is a football club in County Clare, Republic of Ireland.

The club was founded in 1977 and entered the Clare Junior League. Its founder members Red Austin, Jim Rocks, Tom McDade (Senior) and Donal Magee (Senior), all originally hailed from Belfast. Jimmy is still involved in the club but all the founder members have sons and grandsons all heavily involved  at present. The link with their origins is reflected in their crest which includes the red hand of Ulster surrounded by the 3 ships of Clare.  The club currently have two junior teams, a youth team and five schoolboy’s teams and a girls team.  All work at the club is voluntary and our existence depends on community support and on a small number of "behind the scenes" people.

Facilities
Since the club’s foundation in 1977 they have played on Shannon Development’s property in Ballycasey with the bare essentials and without facilities to supply water and electricity.  Having decided to take the decision to purchase their own land, the club committed to develop this area to the highest standard and now boast the best pitches in Clare if not the province. Their main objective was to develop good playing surfaces to facilitate the young in Shannon and to encourage good quality football throughout the season regardless of weather.  Surfaces in Shannon must be developed from scratch as the area is mostly former bogland and below sea level and the club was aware that a six-figure sum would be required in order to develop the proper playing surfaces for pitches. They were the first club in Clare to obtain the use of three playing pitches with  proper dressing room facilities. Having developed schoolboy soccer for the last 25 years they have recently added girls/women's teams as a further commitment to the town.

Newtown started playing on these pitches in September 1998. Not one penny was borrowed. The weekly club lottery paid out big jackpot prizes in the local area as well as contributing handsomely to the grounds development. The same familiar faces buy and sell tickets week in, week out.  Without this local grass root support the enterprise would have been a non-starter.  Local businesses also came on board to give a helping hand. Shannon Town Commissioners, Clare County Council and the National Lottery also helped with well-timed cash grants. Newtown had now come a long way. In 1982 club records show its profits for that year were a handsome £32.

Phase 2 is now commencing and the club is again starting from scratch.  The next phase is to provide proper training facilities.

Competition
Although a relatively new club the "A" team won its first premier league title in 1987 under manager Brendan Wall and that same season they defeated League of Ireland opponents Limerick City (1-0) under Billy Hamilton. Two years later they won the league and cup double and reached the quarter finals of the Munster Junior Cup where they were narrowly defeated after a replay. In 1992 Newtown made its mark at national level by reaching the last 16 in the FAI Junior Cup (over 1000 teams originally entered). A year later incredibly Newtown went one step further and reached the last eight in the country – only to be defeated 1-0 by Buttevant AFC (Cork AUL) after a replay (3-3 in drawn game). Manager during this period was founder member and former player Jimmy Rocks. Numerous league and cup titles have been won at schoolboy and youths level as well as some great success in the SFAI national cup competitions.

Newtown can boast  having supplied both of Clare's Junior/Amateur internationals in Paul Carr, who later starred for Limerick FC and Waterford in the LOI and David Wall, with the latter also playing for Limerick 37 FC.

Their latest success is their Women's team which, in its second year in existence, have won the Limerick Leagues 2nd Division and reached the semifinal of the WFAI Junior Cup

Present
Recently Newtown Football Club have decided to Co-partner Park A.F.C in the Limerick League with Newtown Managers, some Players and other members of staff joining the facilities at Riverside Park. Latest news is that former Newtown player and junior international Davey Wall has taken over as first team manager cementing joining of both clubs in what should be a bright future for the club and the town.

Shannon Hibernians FC was formed as a result of Newtown FC and Park AFC joining forces. Currently Shannon Hibs First team play in the LDMC (LIMERICK) division 1A. Hibs as they are now known also have a B team, ladies' team, Youth team, 17's and school boy/girls teams ranging from under 5's up to under 16 years of age.
Shannon Hibernians were promoted to the Limerick junior Premier League finishing 2nd to Geraldines in the 2010-11 season

1977 establishments in Ireland
Association football clubs established in 1977
Association football clubs in County Clare